Herbert Waas (born 8 September 1963) is a German former footballer who played as a striker, and won 11 caps for West Germany, scoring once.

Club career
Waas spent the most prolific time of his career with Bayer Leverkusen, with whom he won the UEFA Cup in 1988. In the Bundesliga he scored 74 goals in 247 matches.

International career
Waas made his debut for the West Germany national team on 6 July 1983 in a 4–2 friendly home win against Luxembourg. He scored his first and final goal in a 2–2 home friendly draw against Spain three years later.

Career statistics
Score and result list West Germany's goal tally first, score column indicates score after Waas goal.

References

External links
 
 
 

1963 births
Living people
People from Passau
Sportspeople from Lower Bavaria
German footballers
Footballers from Bavaria
Association football forwards
Germany under-21 international footballers
Germany international footballers
UEFA Cup winning players
TSV 1860 Munich players
Bayer 04 Leverkusen players
Bologna F.C. 1909 players
Hamburger SV players
FC Zürich players
Dynamo Dresden players
Bundesliga players
Serie A players
German expatriate footballers
German expatriate sportspeople in Italy
Expatriate footballers in Italy
German expatriate sportspeople in Switzerland
Expatriate footballers in Switzerland
West German footballers
West German expatriate footballers
West German expatriate sportspeople in Italy